Sandra López Reyes is a Mexican long-distance runner.  At the 2012 Summer Olympics, she competed in the Women's 5000 metres, finishing 33rd overall in Round 1, failing to qualify for the final.

Personal bests

Achievements

References

External links

Sports reference biography

1984 births
Living people
Mexican female long-distance runners
Mexican female steeplechase runners
Olympic athletes of Mexico
Athletes (track and field) at the 2012 Summer Olympics
Sportspeople from Tlaxcala
People from Tlaxcala City
Central American and Caribbean Games silver medalists for Mexico
Central American and Caribbean Games bronze medalists for Mexico
Competitors at the 2010 Central American and Caribbean Games
Competitors at the 2014 Central American and Caribbean Games
Central American and Caribbean Games medalists in athletics
Athletes (track and field) at the 2011 Pan American Games
Pan American Games competitors for Mexico
20th-century Mexican women
21st-century Mexican women